The Interton Video Computer 4000 (officially abbreviated as Interton VC 4000) is an early 8-bit ROM cartridge-based second-generation home video game console that was released in Germany, England, France, Spain, Austria, the Netherlands and Australia in 1978 by German hearing aid manufacturer Interton. The console is quite obscure outside Germany, but many software-compatible systems can be found in numerous European countries (see versions of the 1292 Advanced Programmable Video System). The console is the successor of the Interton Video 3001 and was sold for 298 Deutsche Mark and discontinued in 1983.

It's unknown if Interton designed and produced the Interton VC 4000 within their own rights, or if they were sold the rights to design and produce it. This is because many other foreign brands have produced "clones" of this system in the preceding years.

The Interton VC 4000's power comes from a Signetics 2650 CPU (which is the same as an Arcadia 2001) and a Signetics 2636 gaming controller. Both controllers contain a 12-button keypad, two fire buttons, and a joystick. Inside the systems control panel, there are four different buttons. The ON/OFF switch, RESET, SELECT, and START.

Released versions
The console was produced by different companies and sold with different names. Not every console is compatible with others due to differences in the shapes and dimensions of the cartridge slots, but all of the systems are software compatible.
In the article about the 1292 Advanced Programmable Video System, there is a table with all the software-compatible consoles grouped by compatibility family (due to the slots).

Technical specifications
 CPU: Signetics 2650A at 0.887 MHz
 Video controller: Signetics 2636
 Data memory: 37 bytes

List of games
The games for the Interton VC 4000 were released on ROM cartridges known as cassettes that were sold for 40-50 Deutsche Mark each.

 Cassette - Car Races
 Cassette - Blackjack
 Cassette - Paddle Games
 Cassette - Tank Battle
 Cassette - Mathematics I
 Cassette - Mathematics II
 Cassette - Air/Sea Battle
 Cassette - Memory/Flag Capture
 Cassette - Intelligence I
 Cassette - Winter Sports
 Cassette - Hippodrome
 Cassette - Hunting
 Cassette - Chess
 Cassette - Motocross
 Cassette - Intelligence II
 Cassette - Intelligence III
 Cassette - Circus
 Cassette - Boxing Match
 Cassette - Outer Space Combat
 Cassette - Melody/Simon
 Cassette - Intelligence IV/Reversi
 Cassette - Chess II
 Cassette - Pinball
 Cassette - Soccer
 Cassette - Bowling/Ninepins
 Cassette - Draughts
 Cassette - Golf
 Cassette - Cockpit
 Cassette - Metropolis/Hangman
 Cassette - Solitaire
 Cassette - Casino
 Cassette - Invaders
 Cassette - Super Invaders
 Cassette - Space Laser (Unreleased)
 Cassette - Rodeo (Unreleased)
 Cassette - Backgammon
 Cassette - Monster Man
 Cassette - Hyperspace
 Cassette - Basketball (Unreleased)
 Cassette - Super-Space

See also 
 1292 Advanced Programmable Video System, contains the software compatibility table of consoles

External links 

SHAMELESSLIFE wordpress blog entry for details for 1292 APVS & Interton VC 4000
Video Game Console Library entry for the 1292 APVS / VC 4000 family
Arcade Italia entry for MAME compatibility

References

Home video game consoles
Second-generation video game consoles
Products introduced in 1978